Christopher William Rankin (born 8 November 1983) is a New Zealand-born British actor who is best known for playing Percy Weasley in the Harry Potter film franchise.

Early life
Rankin was born in Auckland, New Zealand. He lived in Rothesay Bay until he was six, attending Kristin School in Albany. He and his parents subsequently moved to Norfolk in the United Kingdom, where he attended Northgate High School in Dereham. His mother, Marilyn Rankin works at a school, among other things.

Career
Rankin began acting at the age of eleven. He attended Shipdham Primary School, Northgate High School, and Dereham Sixth Form College. At Northgate High School he appeared in school plays of Bugsy Malone and The Lion, The Witch and The Wardrobe. His professional acting career began when he won the role of Percy Weasley in September 2000 and he has since appeared in film, TV and theatre. In the Harry Potter series, he is a brother of Harry Potter's best friend, Ron Weasley.

Rankin is the co-founder of a theatre company, Painted Horse UK. He re-appeared in the final two films of the Harry Potter film franchise, Harry Potter and the Deathly Hallows – Part 1 and Part 2, after his character's absence from Harry Potter and the Goblet of Fire and Harry Potter and the Half-Blood Prince, and only a brief non-speaking role in Harry Potter and the Order of the Phoenix.

Outside of the Harry Potter films, Rankin has also been seen in the TV mini-series The Rotters' Club and Channel 5's "Victoria Cross Heroes" in which he played Evelyn Wood.

On stage, Chris has played a variety of roles in pantomimes across the country, as well as Edgar Linton in Wuthering Heights, Eilert Loevborg in Hedda Gabler and Young Syrian in Salomé.

He completed his study at the University of Lincoln in 2011.

In 2009, Rankin starred in and produced a YouTube video titled "LifeHack", directed by Thomas "TomSka" Ridgewell, in which he played a vigilante hacker who accesses people's personal photos to find a missing woman. He also appeared as Mycroft Holmes in the Hillywood Show's "Sherlock" parody in 2016.

Chris now works in Television and Film production and is credited as Production Secretary on "Atlantis" (Urban Myth Films/BBC Wales). In 2002 he began to work as an usher at UCI Cinemas.

Film, television and stage

References

External links

Chris' MySpace

1983 births
English male film actors
English male stage actors
English male television actors
Living people
People from Auckland
21st-century English male actors
Actors from Norfolk
New Zealand emigrants to the United Kingdom
New Zealand expatriates in England
21st-century New Zealand male actors
New Zealand male film actors
New Zealand male television actors
New Zealand male stage actors
People educated at Kristin School
Alumni of the University of Lincoln